The 1871 Philadelphia mayoral election saw the election of William S. Stokley.

Results

References

1871
Philadelphia
Philadelphia mayoral
19th century in Philadelphia